Theorem prover may refer to:
 Automated theorem prover
 Proof assistant, an interactive theorem prover